The following NASCAR national series were held in 2012:

2012 NASCAR Sprint Cup Series – The top racing series in American NASCAR
2012 NASCAR Nationwide Series – The second-highest racing series in American NASCAR
2012 NASCAR Camping World Truck Series – The third-highest racing series in American NASCAR
2012 NASCAR Canadian Tire Series season – The top racing series in Canadian NASCAR
2012 NASCAR Toyota Series season – The top racing series in Mexican NASCAR
2012 NASCAR Stock V6 Series – The second-highest racing series in Mexican NASCAR

 
NASCAR seasons